Friedrich Hartjenstein (3 July 1905 – 20 October 1954) was a German SS functionary during the Nazi era. A member of the SS-Totenkopfverbände, he served at various Nazi concentration camps such as Auschwitz and Sachsenhausen. After the Second World War, Hartjenstein was tried and found guilty for murder and crimes against humanity.

Camp officer

Hartjenstein, who was born in Peine, began his SS work at Sachsenhausen in 1938. The following year he was transferred to Niederhagen. In 1941 Hartjenstein served for a year with the 3rd SS Division Totenkopf, a Waffen SS combat division.

In 1942, he was appointed the commandant of Birkenau. This was the main camp at Auschwitz, which contained the extermination facilities and crematoria. In 1944 Hartjenstein was appointed commandant of Natzweiler concentration camp in France. In 1945 he went to work at Flossenbürg concentration camp.

Post war trials
Hartjenstein was arrested by the British and sentenced to life imprisonment on 6 June 1946 at Wuppertal for executing four female agents of the British clandestine Special Operations Executive organization. He was then tried for hanging a Royal Air Force POW, for which he was sentenced to death.

Hartjenstein was then extradited to France where he was tried for his crimes at Natzweiler and received another death sentence. He died of a heart attack while awaiting execution on 20 October 1954, aged 49, in Paris.

References
 Karin Orth: Die Konzentrationslager-SS. Sozialstrukturelle Analysen und biographische Studien. ungek. Ausg. München 2004, 
 Staatliches Museum Auschwitz-Birkenau (Hrsg.): Auschwitz in den Augen der SS. Oświęcim 1998, 
 Tom Segev: Die Soldaten des Bösen. Zur Geschichte der KZ-Kommandanten. Rowohlt, Reinbek bei Hamburg 1995, .
 Ernst Klee: Das Personenlexikon zum Dritten Reich: Wer war was vor und nach 1945. Fischer-Taschenbuch-Verlag, Frankfurt am Main 2005, .
 Wacław Długoborski, Franciszek Piper (Hrsg.): Auschwitz 1940–1945. Studien zur Geschichte des Konzentrations- und Vernichtungslagers Auschwitz, Verlag Staatliches Museum Auschwitz-Birkenau, Oswiecim 1999, 5 Bände: I. Aufbau und Struktur des Lagers. II. Die Häftlinge - Existentzbedingungen, Arbeit und Tod. III. Vernichtung. IV. Widerstand. V. Epilog., .

1905 births
1954 deaths
People from Peine (district)
Auschwitz concentration camp personnel
Flossenbürg concentration camp personnel
Sachsenhausen concentration camp personnel
SS-Obersturmbannführer
Holocaust trials
Holocaust perpetrators in France
Holocaust perpetrators in Poland
Holocaust perpetrators in Germany
Natzweiler-Struthof concentration camp personnel
Nazi concentration camp commandants
People from the Province of Hanover
Waffen-SS personnel
Prisoners sentenced to death by the British military
Prisoners sentenced to death by France
German prisoners sentenced to death
German people who died in prison custody
Prisoners who died in French detention